Cornelius Francis (Frank) Maher (born 1934) is a Newfoundland musician known for his work on the buttonbox (diatonic accordion). Maher has performed solo, as well as with "almost every traditional band on the island at some point in his career", and as the leader of the band Maher's Bahers.

Maher was raised in The Battery, St. John's, and began his musical career playing harmonica for US Navy ships in the harbor, and later was taught by his mother to play the single-row diatonic accordion. When the bar he was employed at burned down, he began playing music professional full-time, playing in the influential band Figgy Duff.

In 2003, Maher appeared naked in the charity calendar Pulling Out All the Stops. In 2003 Maher was awarded the 2003 St. John's Folk Arts Council Lifetime Achievement Award; in 2007 he received the Stompin' Tom Award, an award for East Coast musicians established in 1993.

Solo works
Mahervelous (2005)

Further reading
Integrating Vernacular Dance with Traditional Music: An Ethnographic Account of the Auntie Crae Band. Kristin M. Harris, Canadian Society for Dance Studies, 2006

References

Canadian folk musicians
Canadian accordionists
Musicians from St. John's, Newfoundland and Labrador
1934 births
Living people
21st-century accordionists